The 1997–98 Thailand Division 1 League was its first season.  A total of 10 teams participated, with 6 teams relegated  from the Thailand Soccer League and 4 teams promoted from the Khǒr Royal Cup.

Member clubs locations
6 clubs relegated from 1996–97 Thailand Soccer League
Thailand Tobacco Monopoly
Osotsapa
Bangkok Bank of Commerce
Chula-Raj-Vithi (Rajvithi-Agfatech)
Krung Thai Bank
Thamrong Thai Samosorn (Singha-Thamrongthai)

4 clubs promoted from 1996 Khǒr Royal Cup 
Rayong-Rajapruk (Rayong Sport Association)
Chonburi-Sannibat-Samut Prakan (Samut Prakan Confederation)
Crown Property Bureau
Bank for Agriculture (Bank for agriculture and agricultural co-operatives)

Final league table

Thai League 2 seasons
1997–98 in Asian second tier association football leagues
1997 in Thai football
1998 in Thai football